Two Gilmore Place is a skyscraper in Burnaby, British Columbia, Canada that is currently under construction. It is located at the intersection of Lougheed Highway and Gilmore Avenue, immediately north of Gilmore station.

History and development
Two Gilmore Place is part of the larger mixed-use development "Gilmore Place". Construction of the complex began in 2021.

See also
List of tallest buildings in Canada
List of tallest buildings in British Columbia
List of tallest buildings in Burnaby

References

Buildings and structures in Burnaby
Residential skyscrapers in Canada
Retail buildings in Canada